Phoxinus tchangi is a species of freshwater fish in the family Cyprinidae. It is endemic to China and Mongolia.

References

Phoxinus
Fish described in 1988